Dexter MacBride (born October 21, 1964) is an American former professional tennis player.

Born in Reston, Virginia, MacBride played college tennis for Trinity University (Texas), before appearing on the professional circuit in the late 1980s.

MacBride qualified for his only Grand Prix singles main draw at 1987 ATP Championships in Mason, Ohio. 

At the 1988 Australian Open he competed in singles qualifying and featured in the main draw of the men's doubles, where he and partner Chris Kennedy lost a marathon first round match to Richey Reneberg and John Ross, 15–17 in the final set.

References

External links
 
 

1964 births
Living people
American male tennis players
Trinity Tigers men's tennis players
Tennis people from Virginia